Stromelysin-3 (SL-3) also known as matrix metalloproteinase-11 (MMP-11) is an enzyme that in humans is encoded by the MMP11 gene.

Function 

Proteins of the matrix metalloproteinase (MMP) family are involved in the breakdown of extracellular matrix in normal physiological processes, such as embryonic development, reproduction, and tissue remodeling, as well as in disease processes, such as arthritis and metastasis. Most MMP's are secreted as inactive proproteins which are activated when cleaved by extracellular proteinases. However, the enzyme encoded by this gene is activated intracellularly by furin within the constitutive secretory pathway. Also in contrast to other MMP's, this enzyme cleaves alpha 1-proteinase inhibitor but weakly degrades structural proteins of the extracellular matrix.

References

Further reading 

Matrix metalloproteinases
EC 3.4.24